, referred to as , is a Japanese passenger railway company, managing infrastructure and operating passenger train service. Its railway system is the largest in Japan, excluding Japan Railways Group. The railway network connects Osaka, Nara, Kyoto, Nagoya, Tsu, Ise, and Yoshino. Kintetsu Railway Co., Ltd. is a wholly owned subsidiary of Kintetsu Group Holdings Co., Ltd.

History

On September 16, 1910,  was founded and renamed  a month after. Osaka Electric Tramway completed Ikoma Tunnel and started operating a line between Osaka and Nara (present-day Nara Line) on April 30, 1914. The modern Kashihara, Osaka, and Shigi lines were completed in the 1920s, followed by the Kyoto Line (a cooperative venture with Keihan Electric Railway). Daiki founded  in 1927, which consolidated  on September 15, 1936.

In 1938, Daiki teamed up with its subsidiary  to operate the first private railway service from Osaka to Nagoya. Another subsidiary Sankyū bought Kansai Express Electric Railway on January 1, 1940 and continued the service on its own. Then, Sankyū consolidated  on August 1. Daiki consolidated its largest subsidiary Sankyū on March 15, 1941 and was renamed . Kankyū consolidated  on February 1, 1943 and moved its headquarters from Uehommachi to Osaka Abenobashi.

Kankyū was renamed  after it consolidated Nankai Railway in June 1944: it maintained the name when Nankai regained its independence in 1947.

After World War II, Kintetsu branched out and became one of the world's largest travel agencies, Kinki Nippon Tourist Co., Ltd., opening offices in the United States of America (Kintetsu International Express, Inc.) and other countries.

The first charged limited express train service started between Uehommachi and Nagoya in 1947, and this is the start of the present Kintetsu limited express trains.

Kintetsu moved its headquarters again from Osaka Abenobashi to Osaka Uehommachi on December 5, 1969.

On June 28, 2003, Kinki Nippon Railway Co., Ltd. was renamed Kintetsu Corporation. The corporation was split on April 1, 2015. Its railway business division was succeeded by Kintetsu Split Preparatory Company, Ltd. (founded on April 30, 2014), while its real estate business division by Kintetsu Real Estate Co., Ltd., its hotel business division by Kintetsu Hotel Systems, Inc., and its retail business by Kintetsu Retail Service Corporation, respectively.

On the same day Kintetsu Corporation was split, it was renamed as Kintetsu Group Holdings Co., Ltd. as a holding company, while Kintetsu Split Preparatory Company, Ltd. was renamed as Kintetsu Railway Co., Ltd.

Abbreviations
From its founding to present
September 16, 1910—April 14, 1941: 
April 15, 1941—May 31, 1944: 
June 1, 1944—1948:  or 
Present:  — used for the official corporate name in English since 2003.
Acquired or merged companies
Sangu Express Electric Railway Co., Ltd.: 
Ise Electric Railway Co., Ltd.: 
Osaka Railway Co., Ltd.: 
Nara Electric Railway Co., Ltd.: 
Mie Electric Railway Co., Ltd.:

Lines

Owned and operated lines (Type I Railway Business), funiculars, and aerial tramway
Following lines belong to Kintetsu's  and  Business under the Railway Business Act. This means that Kintetsu is the owner and operator of the lines.

lines
All lines operate with 1,500 V DC overhead catenary except for the Keihanna Line, which operates on 750 V DC third rail.
Osaka Line and its branch
Osaka Line (Osaka Uehommachi - Ise-Nakagawa)
Shigi Line (Kawachi-Yamamoto - ShigiSangūchi)
Nagoya Line and its branches
Nagoya Line (Kintetsu Nagoya - Ise-Nakagawa)
Yunoyama Line (Kintetsu Yokkaichi - Yunoyama-Onsen)
Suzuka Line (Ise-Wakamatsu - Hiratacho)
Yamada/Toba/Shima Line
Yamada Line (Ise-Nakagawa - Ujiyamada)
Toba Line (Ujiyamada - Toba)
Shima Line (Toba - Kashikojima)
Namba/Nara Line and its branch
Namba Line (Ōsaka Namba - Ōsaka Uehommachi)
Nara Line (Fuse - Kintetsu-Nara)
Ikoma Line (Ikoma - Oji)
Keihanna Line (Nagata - Gakken Nara-Tomigaoka)**
Kyoto/Kashihara Line and its branches
Kyoto Line (Kyoto - Yamato-Saidaiji)
Kashihara Line (Yamato-Saidaiji - Kashiharajingu-mae)
Tenri Line (Hirahata - Tenri)
Tawaramoto Line (Shin-Oji - Nishi-Tawaramoto)

narrow gauge lines
Minami Osaka/Yoshino Line and its branches
Minami Osaka Line (Osaka Abenobashi - Kashiharajingu-mae)
Domyoji Line (Domyoji - Kashiwara)
Nagano Line (Furuichi - Kawachi-Nagano)
Gose Line (Shakudo - Kintetsu Gose)
Yoshino Line (Kashiharajingu-mae - Yoshino)

Cable car (Funicular) lines
Ikoma Line (Toriimae - Ikoma-Sanjo)
Nishi-Shigi Line (ShigiSangūchi - Takayasuyama)

Ropeway (aerial tramway)
Katsuragisan Ropeway (Katsuragi-tozanguchi - Katsuragi-sanjo)

Operated lines owned by other entities (Type II Railway Business)
Following line belongs to Kintetsu's  under the Railway Business Act. This means that Kintetsu operates trains on the line, but the owner of the railway trackage is a separate company.
 line
Keihanna Line (Ikoma - Gakken-Nara-Tomigaoka, trackage owned by Nara Ikoma Rapid Transit Railway Co., Ltd.)

Owned lines operated by other entities (Type III Railway Business)
Following lines belong to Kintetsu's  under the Railway Business Act. This means that Kintetsu is the owner of the railway facility, but the trains are operated by separate companies.
 narrow gauge lines
Iga Line (Iga-Ueno - Iga-Kambe, trains operated by Iga Railway Co., Ltd.)
Yōrō Line (Kuwana - Ogaki - Ibi, trains operated by Yōrō Railway Co., Ltd.)

Until September 30, 2007, those lines were part of the Category 1 railway business.

Through-train services
Kintetsu trains also run on the Osaka Metro Chūō Line (all Keihanna Line trains), the Kyoto Municipal Subway Karasuma Line, and the Hanshin Railway Hanshin Namba Line, but such lines are not Kintetsu lines.

Abandoned lines and transferred lines
Hase Line (長谷線) (Sakurai - Hase, abandoned )
Sanjo Line (山上線) (Takayasuyama - Shigizammon, discontinued on January 7, 1944 and abandoned on )
Horyuji Line (法隆寺線) (Shin-Horyuji - Hirahata, discontinued on February 11, 1945 and abandoned on )
Obusa Line (小房線) (Unebi - Kashiharajingu-eki, discontinued on June 1, 1950 and abandoned on )
Ise Line (伊勢線) (Edobashi - Shin-Matsusaka - Daijingu-mae)
Shin-Matsusaka - Daijingu-mae: abandoned on 
Edobashi - Shin-Matsusaka: abandoned on 
Iga Line (伊賀線) (Nishi-Nabari - Iga-Kambe, abandoned on )
Shima Line (志摩線) (Kashikojima - Shinjuko, abandoned on )
Hachioji Line (八王子線) (Nishihino - Ise-Hachioji, discontinued on July 25, 1974 and abandoned on )
Higashi-Shigi Cable Line (東信貴鋼索線) (Shigisanshita - Shigisan, abandoned on )
Hokusei Line (Nishi-Kuwana - Ageki, transferred to Sangi Railway Co. on April 1, 2003)
Utsube Line (Kintetsu Yokkaichi - Utsube, transferred to Yokkaichi Asunaro Railway Company on April 1, 2015)
Hachioji Line (Hinaga - Nishi-Hino, transferred to Yokkaichi Asunaro Railway Company on April 1, 2015)

Lines transferred to Nankai Electric Railway
To separate both former Kankyū lines and Nankai Railway lines, on June 1, 1947, the following lines were transferred to Nankai Electric Railway Co. Ltd. that was renamed from Kōyasan Electric Railway Co., Ltd. 
Nankai Main Line (Namba - Wakayamashi)
Tennoji Branch Line (天王寺支線) (Tengachaya - Tennoji)
Tengachaya - Imaikecho: abandoned on 
Imaikecho - Tennoji: abandoned on 
Takashinohama Line (Hagoromo - Takashinohama)
Tanagawa Line (Misakikoen - Tanagawa)
Kada Line (Kinokawa - Kada)
Kitajima Branch Line (北島支線) (Wakayamashi - Higashi-Matsue, abandoned on )
Koya Line (Shiomibashi - Koyashita)
Hankai Line (Ebisucho - Hamadera-eki-mae) (transferred to Hankai Tramway Co., Ltd. on December 1, 1980)
Ohama Branch Line (大浜支線) (Shukuin - Ohama-kitaguchi - Ohamakaigan)
Ohama-kitaguchi - Ohamakaigan: abandoned on 
Shukuin - Ohama-kitaguchi: closed on July 10, 1945, abandoned on 
Uemachi Line (Tennoji-eki-mae - Sumiyoshikoen) (transferred to Hankai Tramway Co., Ltd. on December 1, 1980)
Hirano Line (平野線) (Imaike - Hirano) (abandoned on )

Unbuilt lines
Gifu Line (岐阜線) (Ogaki - Gifu or Hashima), planned by Yoro Electric Railway Co.
Shijonawate Line (四条畷線) (Sakuranomiya - Nukata), planned by Osaka Electric Railway Co.

Rolling stock
, Kintetsu operates a fleet of 1,905 electric multiple unit (EMU) vehicles, the second largest fleet for a private railway operator in Japan after Tokyo Metro (2,766 vehicles). The newest Hinotori 80000 series EMU trainsets entered revenue service on limited express services between Osaka Namba and Kintetsu Nagoya in spring 2020. Eight six-car sets and three eight-car sets, 72 vehicles in total, will enter service by 2021. Seating in both types of accommodation will consist of fixed-back shell seats.

Future
In May 2022 Kintetsu announced that new commuter trainsets would be in service for 2024.

Fare cards 

Kintetsu accepts ICOCA, PiTaPa, and other compatible nation-wide IC cards throughout their network except on the Ikoma cable car and Katsuragi ropeway. Various discount tickets are also available from their website or ticket machines, with varying valid areas and usage periods. Surutto Kansai passes can be used in the Keihanshin area, west of Aoyamachō and north of Tsubosakayama stations.

Offices of Kintetsu
Headquarters and Osaka Transportation Department, Railway Headquarters, Railway Headquarters: 1-55, Uehommachi Rokuchome, Tennoji-ku, Osaka
Nagoya Transportation Department, Railway Headquarters: 16-11, Unomori Itchome, Yokkaichi, Mie

See also
 Yamato Bunkakan

References

External links

 
 about Kintetsu

Companies listed on the Tokyo Stock Exchange

Railway companies of Japan
Railway companies established in 1910
Companies based in Osaka Prefecture
Holding companies of Japan
Companies listed on the Nagoya Stock Exchange
Holding companies established in 1910
Japanese companies established in 1910